Olive Evelyn Smuts-Kennedy  (née Wright, 23 March 1925 – 19 December 2013) was an activist and local politician in Wellington, New Zealand.

Biography

Early life
Olive Smuts-Kennedy was born on 23 March 1925. Her grandfather, Fortunatus Evelyn Wright was an early New Zealand settler, having arrived from England aboard the ship Samarang in 1852. In 1945 she married Arthur Edward Smuts-Kennedy and had one son and two daughters. She attended Auckland University and graduated with a Bachelor of Arts in 1951 and later a Bachelor of Law in 1955. She was admitted to the Bar that same year. She was involved with the women's rights organisation The Council for Equal Pay and Opportunity (affiliated with the National Council of Women) serving as its chairperson from 1960 to 1964. In 1965 she became a SEATO research fellow.

Political career
Smuts-Kennedy stood for election to the New Zealand House of Representatives for the Labour Party in four consecutive elections. She came in second place on every occasion. Additionally she was approached to stand for Labour in the 1967 Petone by-election, however she was not selected as a candidate. She also served as the President of the Wellington Labour Representation Committee.

In 1965 Smuts-Kennedy won a seat on the Wellington City Council on a Labour ticket which she was to hold until 1973 when she resigned. During her time as a councillor she was chairperson of the cultural, libraries and public relations committees.

Later life
In the 1990 Queen's Birthday Honours, Smuts-Kennedy was appointed a Companion of the Queen's Service Order for public services.

She died 19 December 2013.

Notes

References

1925 births
2013 deaths
New Zealand women lawyers
University of Auckland alumni
Wellington City Councillors
New Zealand Labour Party politicians
Companions of the Queen's Service Order
Unsuccessful candidates in the 1960 New Zealand general election
Unsuccessful candidates in the 1963 New Zealand general election
Unsuccessful candidates in the 1966 New Zealand general election
Unsuccessful candidates in the 1969 New Zealand general election
20th-century New Zealand lawyers